Jo Yu-ri (born October 22, 2001) is a South Korean singer and actress. She is known as a former member of the South Korean–Japanese girl group Iz*One. Following the dissolution of Iz*One in April 2021, she debuted as a solo artist with the single album Glassy in October of the same year.

Career

2017–2020: Pre-debut and Iz*One 

In July 2017, Jo participated in Mnet's reality television show Idol School where the nine final participants would debut with newly formed girl group Fromis 9. She finished in 15th place.

On May 11, 2018, Jo participated in Mnet's reality television show Produce 48 where she finished in 3rd place. As one of twelve successful participants, she went on to be a part of the newly formed girl group Iz*One. On October 29, 2018, Jo debuted as a member of Iz*One with the release of Color*Iz. The group disbanded on April 29, 2021, upon the expiration of their contract.

On September 22, 2020, Jo released "My Love" for SBS's television series Do You Like Brahms?.

2021–present: Solo activities 
On June 24, 2021, Jo released "Story of Us" for JTBC's television series Monthly Magazine Home.

On September 23, Jo released "Autumn Memories", a collaboration song with Lee Seok-hoon. On September 24, Wake One Entertainment announced that Jo will be releasing her first single album titled Glassy on October 7, with lead single of the same name.

On April 11, 2022, Jo was cast for Playlist Studio's upcoming web series Mimicus.

On May 17, Wake One Entertainment announced that Jo would be releasing her first extended play titled Op.22 Y-Waltz: in Major on June 2, with lead single "Love Shhh!".

On August 11, Jo released the promotional single "Maybe" through Universe.

On October 8, Wake One Entertainment announced that Jo would be releasing her second single album titled Op.22 Y-Waltz: in Minor on October 24.

Discography

Extended plays

Single albums

Singles

Soundtrack appearances

Composition credits
All song credits are adapted from the Korea Music Copyright Association's database unless stated otherwise.

Filmography

Web series

Television shows

Web shows

Awards and nominations

Notes

References

External links
 
 

2001 births
Living people
Musicians from Busan
K-pop singers
South Korean female idols
South Korean women pop singers
21st-century South Korean women singers
Iz*One members
Produce 48 contestants
Japanese-language singers of South Korea
Reality show winners
Swing Entertainment artists
South Korean web series actresses
21st-century South Korean actresses
Wake One Entertainment artists